Roof Butte ( "Roof shaped mountain on the run") is a peak in the Chuska Mountains in Arizona, United States. Roof Butte is the highest peak of the Chuska Mountains which run in a north-northwest direction across the Arizona-New Mexico border. Roof Butte is a visible butte for miles around. A manned-lookout tower is located on Roof Butte. Two funnel shaped explosion volcanic pipes formed the flattish summit of Roof Butte, and a low lava dome caps one nearby peak.

Access to the Navajo Nation requires a permit.

References

External links
 
 
 

Landforms of Apache County, Arizona
Buttes of Arizona